Carmen Romano de López Portillo (born Carmen Romano Nolk; 10 February 1926 – 9 May 2000) was the First Lady of Mexico from 1976 to 1982. She was the first wife of Mexican president José López Portillo.

Personal life and death

In the 1970s, actress Sasha Montenegro maintained a relationship with José López Portillo, who was still married to Carmen Romano, with whom he had three children. López Portillo obtained a divorce from Carmen Romano and then married Montenegro in 1995.

Gallery

See also
List of first ladies of Mexico 
Politics of Mexico

References

External links

1926 births
2000 deaths
First ladies of Mexico
People from Mexico City
Mexican people of Italian descent